This is a list of NGC objects 1001–2000 from the New General Catalogue (NGC). The astronomical catalogue is composed mainly of star clusters, nebulae, and galaxies. Other objects in the catalogue can be found in the other subpages of the list of NGC objects.

The constellation information in these tables is taken from The Complete New General Catalogue and Index Catalogue of Nebulae and Star Clusters by J. L. E. Dreyer, which was accessed using the "VizieR Service". Galaxy morphological types and objects that are members of the Large Magellanic Cloud are identified using the NASA/IPAC Extragalactic Database. The other data of these tables are from Wolfgang Steinicke's Revised New General Catalogue and Index Catalogue and/or the SIMBAD Astronomical Database unless otherwise stated.

1001–1100

1101–1200

1201–1300

1301–1400

1401–1500

1501–1600

1601–1700

1701–1800

1801–1900

1901–2000

See also
 Lists of astronomical objects

Notes

References

 2
NGC objects 1000-1999